The House of Văcărescu was a boyar family of Wallachia (now part of Romania).
According to tradition, it is one of the oldest noble families in Wallachia.

Notable members 
 Enache Văcărescu (1654–1714) grand treasurer of Wallachia (killed with his master, Prince Brancovan)
 Ienăchiță Văcărescu (1730–1796) poet, wrote the first Romanian grammar
 Alecu Văcărescu (died 1798), poet
 Nicolae Văcărescu (died 1830), poet
 Barbu Văcărescu (died 1832), the last Great Ban of Craiova
 Iancu Văcărescu (1786–1863), poet
 Marițica Bibescu (1815–1859), poet and Princess-consort of Wallachia
 Claymoor (Mișu Văcărescu) (ca. 1843–1903), journalist
 Maurice Paléologue (1859–1944), writer and French diplomat
 Elena Văcărescu (1864–1947), poet

See also
Phanariotes
 Văcărești (disambiguation)

References

 
Romanian boyar families
Wallachian nobility